Mulher Objeto is a 1981 Brazilian erotic drama directed by Silvio de Abreu.

Synopsis 
Story about the fantasies of a married woman who lives in a dream several experiences with partners of both sexes.

Cast 
 Helena Ramos as Regina 
 Nuno Leal Maia as Hélio 
 Kate Lyra as Helen 
 Maria Lúcia Dahl as Maruska 
 Hélio Souto as Fernando
 Yara Amaral as Carmem 
 Wilma Dias as Lúcia 
 Karin Rodrigues as Analista 
 Carlos Koppa as Genésio

Production
Helena Ramos was pregnant during filming. Director Silvio de Abreu recalls: "She never complained about anything, she was always on time, knew the text, obeyed the markings, followed the intonations and responded to the stimuli. We only had one problem in the last scene shot. It was a very naughty sex sequence, she was naked with her body covered in oil so that her beautiful forms would shine in the sun, on top of a horse with Danton Jardim, also naked. I told her to repeat it many times and she ended up losing patience: 'I can't ride anymore, I'm pregnant, I'll lose my son'. No one knew about her condition, and so, once again, she proved her professionalism, putting up with it as much as she could to do the scene in the best possible way."

References

External links
 

1980s erotic drama films
1981 films
1981 drama films
BDSM in films
Brazilian erotic drama films
Female bisexuality in film
Films about dreams
Films directed by Silvio de Abreu
1980s Portuguese-language films